Ruiwen Zhang is a Chinese-American pharmaceutical scientist and is Robert L. Boblitt Endowed Professor in Drug Discovery currently at University of Houston. He is Elected Fellow of the American Association for the Advancement of Science.

References

Year of birth missing (living people)
Living people
Fellows of the American Association for the Advancement of Science
Fudan University alumni
American pharmacologists
Texas A&M University faculty